Sintes is a surname. Notable people with the surname include:

Ariadna Sintes (born 1986), Cuban-Spanish actress
Claude Sintes (born 1953), French archaeologist and curator
Victor Sintès (born 1980), French-born Algerian fencer
Yvonne Pope Sintes (1930–2021), British aviator of South African origin